The Immaculate Conception Cathedral  also called Jungang Cathedral of the Immaculate Conception of Mary and locally Jungang Cathedral, is a religious building located in the city of Jeju in the extreme south of the Asian country of South Korea.

The temple follows the Roman or Latin rite and is the principal church of the Diocese of Jeju (Dioecesis Cheiuensis; 제주 교구) which was raised to its current status in 1977 by Pope Paul VI by bull "Munus Apostolicum".

It is under the pastoral responsibility of the Bishop Peter Kang U-il.

See also
Roman Catholicism in South Korea
Immaculate Conception Cathedral (disambiguation)

References

Roman Catholic cathedrals in South Korea
Jeju City